Oxyparna diluta is a species of tephritid or fruit flies in the genus Oxyparna of the family Tephritidae.

Distribution
Kyrgyzstan, Tajikistan, Mongolia, China.

References

Tephritinae
Insects described in 1908
Taxa named by Theodor Becker
Diptera of Asia